The following lists events that happened during 1950 in Chile.

Incumbents
President of Chile: Gabriel González Videla

Events

January 
 24 January – The Chilean Government orders troops to their garrisons in response to strikes.

March 
 18 March – The Chilean Government abolishes 'emergency zones' created around vital economic areas created in 1947 to deter strikes.

June
19 June – Empresa Nacional del Petróleo is created.

July
7 July - The newspaper La Tercera de La Hora, edited in Santiago and owned by Copesa, is founded.

December 
9 December - An intraplate earthquake of magnitude 8.2 occurs inside the Department of Loa, near Calama
 29 December – Admiral Carlos Torres accepts the transfer of USS Brooklyn and USS Nashville to the Chilean Navy under the Mutual Defense Assistance Act.

Births
4 February – Teresita Reyes
9 March – Jorge Marchant Lazcano
21 March – Julio Crisosto
24 April – Rafael González (Chilean footballer)
25 June – Paco Saval
5 July – Carlos Caszely
11 July – Hernán Rivera Letelier
14 July – Mario Osbén (d. 2021)
17 September – Patricia Maldonado Aravena
26 October – Jorge Socías

Deaths
27 January – Augusto d'Halmar (b. 1882)
24 August -Arturo Alessandri (b. 1868)

References 

 
Years of the 20th century in Chile
Chile